Chit-Chat is an Australian morning television program which aired 1967 on Melbourne station ATV-0 (now ATV-10 and part of Network Ten). It was a daytime interview program. It aired at 10:30AM, and aired against a test pattern on ABV-2, Lincoln Land (including Here's Humphrey) on GTV-9, and no programming on HSV-7.

References

External links
 

1967 Australian television series debuts
1967 Australian television series endings
Black-and-white Australian television shows
English-language television shows
Australian television talk shows